Kjetil-Vidar Haraldstad (stage name Frost; born 28 June 1973) is the Norwegian drummer in black metal bands Satyricon and 1349. He was born in Øyer, Oppland.

Frost has previously performed with Gorgoroth, Zyklon-B, Gehenna and Keep Of Kalessin. He originally joined Satyricon temporarily to record the demo The Forest is My Throne, later joining the band full-time. He has a degree in Engineering, having taken a course in Computer Science at the University of Oslo.

He is regarded as one of the fastest and most proficient drummers in the black metal and extreme metal genres. Frost employs various drumming styles when performing with different bands; in 1349 and early Satyricon he extensively uses blast beats, with his most recent work in Satyricon being more thought-out and mid-tempo. On all Satyricon albums his role is credited simply as "battery".

Frost was denied entry to North America by the US Department of Homeland Security upon failing to note having been sentenced to 5 months for assault (during a bar fight in the early '90s) when applying for his work visa.
On 1349 tours before 2008, he was replaced by Tony Laureano. Joey Jordison and Trym Torson have performed with Satyricon on North American tour dates. He later was able to perform again in the United States.

He appeared in the documentary film Until The Light Takes Us as part of an art piece by Norwegian artist Bjarne Melgaard, featuring him firebreathing, cutting himself with a knife, and destroying the set.

Since 2018 Frost adheres to a mostly plant-based vegan diet. He says that he has shown appreciation for good food and believes it will be the future in terms of what humans consume on a daily basis. He predicts that "the world will be completely different on the subject of food — and even quality of food, actually." Frost also says that his diet helped him become more productive with Satyricon.

Equipment 
Frost uses Tama drums and pedals, Zildjian cymbals, and Vic Firth drumsticks.

Drums: Tama Starclassic Bubinga: 
 24"x18" bass drums (x2) 
 12"x9" rack tom 
 13"x10" rack tom 
 14"x11" rack tom 
 16"x13" floor tom    
 18"x16" floor tom  
 14"x5.5" snare 
 Iron Cobra Power Glide Kick Pedals

Cymbals: Zildjian: 
 16" A Custom fast crash 
 16" K Custom fast crash  
 14" K light hi-hats 
 17" A Custom fast crash 
 20" FX Oriental china "trash" 
 9.5" Zil-Bel Large 
 11" FX Oriental "trash" splash  
 14" A Custom fast crash 
 10" A Custom splash  
 14" Special K/Z hi-hats 
 17" K Custom dark china  
 18" A Custom crash 
 21" A mega bell ride 
 20" FX Oriental crash of doom 
 16" FX Oriental china "trash"

Discography

References

External links
Frost interview for voicesfromthedarkside

1973 births
21st-century Norwegian drummers
Gorgoroth members
Living people
Male drummers
Norwegian black metal musicians
Norwegian heavy metal drummers
People from Øyer
Satyricon (band) members
University of Oslo alumni